Puente No. 6, in Caguas, Puerto Rico is a historic bridge which was built in 1856.  It was listed on the National Register of Historic Places in 2009 and is located at Puerto Rico Highway 798, Km. 1.0 in Río Cañas barrio.

It has also been known as Bridge #6, as Ponton La Concepcion, and as (La) Concepcion Bridge. It spans the Cañas River. It is a brick barrel vault bridge. It was built as part of the Río Piedras-Caguas highway program.

The image at right is from Our Islands and their People by Jose de Olivares, published in 1899 after the Spanish-American War.

References

Road bridges on the National Register of Historic Places in Puerto Rico
Bridges completed in 1856
1850s establishments in Puerto Rico
Brick bridges
Caguas, Puerto Rico
1856 establishments in the Spanish Empire